Bhimber is a town and the headquarters of an eponymous district in Azad Kashmir, Pakistan.

History
Bhimber was the capital of the Chibhal dynasty, which lasted from 1400 to 1856.

Bhimber lies on the route that was followed by the Mughal Emperors for their frequent visits to the Kashmir Valley. It is also known as "Baab-e-Kashmir" (Door to Kashmir) because of its importance and geographical location, which was ideal for the Mughal Emperors to use to enter Kashmir. Therefore, the Mughals used Bhimber as a staging point for their journey to Srinagar. The Mughal Emperor Jahangir discussed Bhimber in his book Tuzk-e-Jahangiri.

Modern history
In the 19th century, Chibhal came under the Maharaja Gulab Singh. Around 1822, along with Poonch, it was granted as a jagir (feudal land grant) to Raja Dhian Singh of the Dogra dynasty, Gulab Singh's brother. After the death of Maharaja Ranjit Singh, the Sikh court fell into disunity, and Dhian Singh was murdered in court intrigue. Subsequently, the princely state of Jammu and Kashmir was formed under the suzerainty of the British Empire, and these territories were transferred to Jammu and Kashmir. The jagir given to Dhian Singh was respected, however, and Dhian Singh's sons Moti Singh and Jawahir Singh were retained as their Rajas.

In 1852, the brothers Jawahir and Moti Singh quarrelled, and the Punjab Board of Revenue awarded a settlement. Moti Singh was awarded the Poonch district, and Jawahir Singh was awarded Bhimber, Mirpur and Kotli. In 1859, Jawahir Singh was accused of 'treacherous conspiracy' by Maharaja Ranbir Singh (r. 1857–1885), who succeeded Gulab Singh. The British agreed with the assessment and forced Jawahir Singh to exile in Ambala. Ranbir Singh paid Jawahir Singh an annual stipend of Rs. 100,000 until his death, and appropriated his territory afterwards because Jawahir Singh had no heirs.

The appropriated territory was organised as the Bhimber district (wazarat) in 1860. In the decade preceding 1911, the district headquarters was shifted to Mirpur and it came to be called the Mirpur district. Bhimber remained a tehsil headquarters until 1947. It had a Hindu majority population, mostly consisting of Mahajans.

Geography and climate

Bhimber is a valley. Its hot, subhumid climate and other geographical conditions closely resemble those of Gujrat, the adjoining district in Punjab.

The climate in Bhimber is classified as warm and temperate. Summers have a good deal of rainfall; winters have much less. This location is classified as Cwa by Köppen. July and August are the wettest months. Temperatures are highest in June.

Notable people 

Manzoor Mirza, economist
Ghulam Rasul Raja, Pakistan Army officer
Raja Muhammad Zulqarnain Khan,Politician,ex President of Azad Jammu and Kashmir

References

Bibliography 

 
 
 
 
 
 
 
 
 
  
 
 

Populated places in Bhimber District
Tehsils of Bhimber District